St. Anne's Catholic Secondary School (also referred to as St. Anne's CSS or stannes) is a Catholic high school in Clinton, Ontario. It is noted for its sports teams and exceptional grades that are usually at or above the provincial expectations. It serves students from grades nine to twelve. The motto of St. Anne's is "in alis aquilae" which is Latin for "on eagle's wings". This motto is taken from the Book of Isaiah, Chapter 40 of the Bible.

Origins

St. Anne's was built in the town of Clinton. Construction began in 1994 and when the school opened; only 139 students were enrolled. These students came from all over Huron County, including Clinton, Goderich, Bayfield, Wingham and Blyth. The enrolment for the year of 2009 stood at about 600 students.  St. Anne's is a rural school and as such, it fills a unique need of catering to those who wish to enter agriculture. St. Anne's is the only French-Immersion Catholic high school in the county. 

The school is under the jurisdiction of the Ontario Ministry of Education and is part of the Huron-Perth Catholic District School Board (HPCDSB). St. Anne's is one of the two high schools in the board.

Uniforms

St. Anne's is a uniform school. The uniform consists of:

Male Apparel
Khaki and navy shorts
Khaki and navy pants
Male kilt
Navy blazer
White, navy and burgundy shirts
Blue cardigan

Female Apparel
Navy Pants
Khaki skirts
Female plaid kilts
Blouses
White, navy and burgundy shirts
Burgundy cardigan
White French-cut shirts
Female Tie

Unisex Apparel
White and blue long-sleeve polos
White and blue polos
Blue V-neck sweaters and sweater vests
Zipper sweaters

Partner Schools

St. Anne's is part of a larger family of schools in the area. The elementary schools which act as "feeder schools" include and are limited to: St. Mary's School in Goderich, St. Joseph's Catholic Elementary School in Clinton, St. James School in Seaforth, Precious Blood School in Exeter, Our Lady of Mount Carmel School in Mount Carmel, Sacred Heart School in Wingham, and St. Boniface School in Zurich. St. Michael's Catholic Secondary School is the other high school in the school board. It serves Perth County and is located in Stratford. It is considered the counterpart of St. Anne's and is often St. Anne's rival in regards to sports and academics. Even with this friendly rivalry, St. Anne's and St. Michael's work together in many aspects.

Faith-Based Education

St. Anne's and the other schools in the board are all Catholic. The families are generally members of the Roman Catholic Church in the Dioceses of London. However, students of all other faiths are allowed in the school but must respect the Catholic aspect (this is why most students are of Christian denominations). All students must take a religion course each school year. To graduate, students need four religion course credits. This course is offered in both French and English.

St. Anne's is part of several parish families within the Diocese of London:  St. Peter's Parish, located in three worship sites including Goderich, Clinton and Kingsbridge;  St. Boniface Parish, Zurich;  Sacred Heart Parish, Wingham;  Precious Blood Parish, Exeter; Our Lady of Mount Carmel Parish, Mount Carmel; St. James Parish, Seaforth. The Priest from this parish is the Priest of the school.

Extra Curricular

St. Anne's has numerous sports teams and clubs. The most popular sports team is the boy's rugby and hockey team. These teams have gone on to provincial tournaments and been successful in many regards. For female students, the field hockey team is very popular and is always successful during their short season in the spring/summer. All of these teams have made it on to OFSAA.

Sports Teams

St. Anne's sports teams include:
Badminton
Basketball
Cross-country running
Curling
Golf
Hockey
Rugby
Swimming
Track-and-field.
Field hockey

Clubs
St. Anne's has numerous clubs and groups. They include:
Concert Band (More Advanced) 

Includes a variety of band children. Directed by Josh Geddis
Junior Band
Rock Band
Jazz Band
Chess Club
Dramatic Arts Club
Enviro-Club
Catholic Leadership Council (A group of students devoted to intensifying the school's faith)
Gaming Club (A club dedicated to playing board games)
A Habitat for Humanity team
The Mathletes
Me to We (a division of Free the Children)
Prom Committee
Students for Life (Anti-abortion group)
Students for Social Justice
The Talon (the school's newsletter team)
Writers' Guild (Creative writing; the motto of the group is: The first rule of Writers' Guild is don't talk about Writers Guild)
Yearbook Committee
Robotics Club
Yoga
Science Club
Lettuce Club
Dart Club
Hypes and Grypes CLub
Mario/Sonic the Hedgehog Fan Club

Student Cabinet 
St. Anne's has a Student Cabinet (the student government, akin to a Student Council) which is made up of students in all grades. Student Cabinet is the chosen name, as it is a Westminster-styled Student Parliament. Cabinet members are referred to as "Ministers". Elections are held every spring with the exception of the grade nine representative who is elected before the Canadian Thanksgiving (elections usually take place late September for Grade 9).

Student Cabinet is in charge of numerous agendas including dances, some fundraisers, school spirit and community involvement. Each member of Student Cabinet has their own portfolios relating to their elected position (e.g. the Ministers of Arts and Culture are in charge of the Coffee House, a talent show held each semester). There is a staff advisor on Student Cabinet along with the Principal, who do have the power to veto any motion that Student Cabinet passes. They are to act as a sober second mind, ensure all activities are safe and to represent the staff of the school.

See also
List of high schools in Ontario

References

External links
 St. Anne's Catholic Secondary School
 The Ministry of Education of Ontario
 The Huron-Perth Catholic District School Board

Catholic secondary schools in Ontario
Educational institutions established in 1995
1995 establishments in Ontario